Jean Wallace (born Jean Walasek or Wallasek; October 12, 1923 – February 14, 1990) was an American television and film actress.

Early life
Wallace was born in Chicago, Illinois to John T. Walaszek and Mary A. Walaszek (née Sharkey). Her grandfather Karol Walaszek emigrated from Galicia. She was Polish-American.

Wallace graduated from Austin High School in Chicago before the family moved to Hollywood in 1940.

Career 

Wallace began her career as a model. She made her screen debut when she was 17, a bit part in Louisiana Purchase (1941).

By the time Wallace turned 18, she had worked as a dancer and singer, appearing as an Earl Carroll showgirl and at Hollywood's Florentine Gardens nightclub.

Personal life 
Wallace married her Jigsaw costar Franchot Tone on October 18, 1941 in Yuma, Arizona. They had two sons, Pascal "Pat" Franchot Tone, born July 29, 1943, and Thomas Jefferson Tone, born September 16, 1945. Wallace and Tone divorced in 1948, and Tone was awarded custody of their sons.

Wallace attempted suicide in 1946 with sleeping pills. In 1949, she made another attempt with a self-inflicted knife wound, causing her to be replaced with Ella Raines as the star of A Dangerous Profession.

In 1950, Wallace married former U.S. Army captain Jim Lloyd Randall, but the marriage was annulled later that year.

Wallace's third marriage was to actor Cornel Wilde, her costar in The Big Combo, Lancelot and Guinevere and Beach Red, from 1951 to 1981. She and Wilde had one son, Cornel Wallace Wilde, born on December 19, 1967.

Wallace was a Democrat and supported Adlai Stevenson during the 1952 presidential election campaign.

Death 
Wallace died of a gastrointestinal hemorrhage on February 14, 1990. She is interred at Hollywood Forever Cemetery.

Filmography

References

External links
 

Actresses from Chicago
American film actresses
American television actresses
Burials at Hollywood Forever Cemetery
1923 births
1990 deaths
20th-century American actresses
American people of Polish descent
Illinois Democrats
California Democrats